Våvatnet is a lake in Orkland Municipality in Trøndelag county, Norway.  The lake was dammed in 1910 and is used as the main reservoir for the municipality of Orkdal. The water flows into the lake Songsjøen and then into the lake Gagnåsvatnet.

See also
List of lakes in Norway

References

Lakes of Trøndelag
Orkland
Reservoirs in Norway